Ashland Elementary School, also known as Ashland Grade School (according to its National Register of Historic Places listing), is a public elementary school in Ashland, Kansas. It is a part of USD 220 Ashland Public Schools.

Located at 210 W. 7th St. in Ashland, Kansas, was built in 1937 with Public Works Administration funding.  It was listed on the NRHP in 2005.

It is a two-story red brick building designed with elements of Classical Revival style.  It has a flat roof with a parapet with stone detailing.

It was deemed significant "as the public grade school in Ashland, an important component in the development and survival of the small rural community in southwest Kansas....and also significant ... as a representative of a New Deal Era school and the
work of regional school architect Glen H. Thomas."

References

External links

 Ashland Elementary School

School buildings on the National Register of Historic Places in Kansas
Neoclassical architecture in Kansas
School buildings completed in 1937
Clark County, Kansas
Public elementary schools in Kansas